George Arthur Heads Emmerson (15 May 1906 – 1966) is an English former professional footballer.

Career

While playing for local side Jarrow, Emmerson was spotted by Middlesbrough and was offered the chance to play league football with the club in 1928. He spent two years at the club, making eight appearances including scoring a hat-trick in his second appearance, a 3–0 victory over Millwall.

He moved to Cardiff City in 1930. A regular in the side during his three years at Ninian Park, including being ever-present during the 1931–32 season. In 1933 he was involved in a swap deal with Ted Marcroft which saw him join Queens Park Rangers. He later finished his career after spells at Rochdale, Tunbridge Wells Rangers and Gillingham. After his retirement he returned to his job as a plumber, a trade he was working in before becoming a footballer.

Don Quixote

References

1906 births
1966 deaths
English footballers
Middlesbrough F.C. players
Cardiff City F.C. players
Queens Park Rangers F.C. players
Rochdale A.F.C. players
Gillingham F.C. players
English Football League players
Jarrow F.C. players
Date of death missing
Place of death missing
Tunbridge Wells F.C. players
Association football midfielders